The Pittsburgh Panthers women's soccer team represent the University of Pittsburgh in the Atlantic Coast Conference (ACC) of NCAA Division I women's college soccer. The team has never won a conference championship. The Panthers have played in both the ACC and Big East.

History

1990s
The Pittsburgh Panther's women's soccer team was founded in 1996 under head coach Roland Sturk and did not play in a conference in the program's first year.  The team finished with a 3–16 record.  The following year, the team joined the Big East Conference, where Pittsburgh was a full member.  The Panthers had fewer losses than their inaugural season, finishing 3–12–3 overall and 2–8–1 in conference play.  The team's first conference win came vs. West Virginia on October 8, 1997.  1998 saw continued improvement for the Panthers.  The team finished 8–11 overall and 5–7 in conference play.  This record was good enough to qualify for the Big East Conference Women's Soccer Tournament.  However, the team lost in the quarterfinals.  1999 saw a bit of a regression when the team finished 5–12–1 and 1–4–1 in conference play.

2000s
The 2000s began similarly for the Panthers, only winning 6 games and losing 12.  Another 1 win conference season was not good enough to qualify for the Big East Tournament.  2001 saw another minor improvement, with the team winning 7 games, and increasing its win tally to 2 in conference play.  However, 2002 proved to be a disappointing year when the team finished 4–15, and winless in conference play.  In January 2003 head coach Roland Sturk resigned as coach.  In March 2003, Sue-Moy Chin was named the Panther's second head coach.  Her first seasons saw small improvements, however, the team lost double digit games in 2003, 2004, and 2005.  However, the team increased its conference win totals as well and qualified for the Big East Tournament in 2005 and 2006.  Both appearances resulted in quarterfinal exits.  2006 was the team's first season without a losing record.  The team finished 8–8–3.  The team would again reach the quarterfinal of the Big East Tournament in 2008.  The team closed the decade with their first-ever winning season, finishing 8–5–5 overall and 3–3–5 in conference play.  It was also the first season the team did not have a losing record in conference play.

2010s
The decade opened with another qualification into the Big East Tournament, and another quarterfinal loss.  However, the success would be short lived as the team finished with just 2 wins in 2011.  This season would be bad enough for the team to hire a third coach in its history, Greg Miller.  Miller was previously an assistant at Ohio State.  Miller's first year, 2012, saw the team finish 7–10–2 overall.  In his second season in charge, the team began play in the Atlantic Coast Conference. In their first season, the Panthers went a winless 0–13 in ACC play.  The team made steady progress finishing with 2 conference wins in 2014 and 4 conference wins in 2015.  2015 would also be the team's second overall winning season.  The Panthers finished 10–7–1.  However, in 2016 and 2017 the team would win one ACC game.  After the 2017 season, Miller was fired.  In December 2017, Randy Waldrum was hired as the new head coach.  Waldrum previously won the NCAA title twice with Notre Dame.  However, his first season proved difficult, only winning 4 overall games and finishing 0–10 in ACC play.  In his second season, the Panthers posted their first ACC win since 2016, finishing with a 2–6–2 ACC record.

2020s 
The decade started with a season shortened by the COVID-19 pandemic.  The Panthers' season was shortened less than other teams in the conference, as they played eight non-conference games.  The team finished tenth overall in the ACC regular season, with a 3–5–0 record.  They won all eight of those non-conference games to finish the season with eleven total wins, setting a program record.  2021 saw a return to a more normal schedule for the Panthers and they finished 11–7–0 and 4–6–0 in the ACC to tie for ninth place.  Their four conference wins tied for the teams most since they joined the ACC, with the other time being in 2015. In 2022, the Panthers finished 14–5–3 and 5–3–2 in ACC play.  The 14 wins were the most in program history, and the five conference wins were tied for the most in program history.  They qualified for their first ever ACC Tournament and their first NCAA Tournament in program history.  They reached the Round of 16 before falling to Florida State to end their historic season.

Personnel

Current roster

Team management

Seasons

^In 1997 Pittsburgh began play in the Big East Conference.
†In 2013 Pittsburgh began play in the Atlantic Coast Conference.

Notable alumni

Current Professional Players
  Amaia Peña (2016–2020) - Currently with Athletic Club

References

External links
 Official Site
 2016 Media Guide

 
Soccer clubs in Pennsylvania
NCAA Division I women's soccer teams
1996 establishments in Pennsylvania
Association football clubs established in 1996